Skywards – A Sylphe's Ascension is the second album by the German melodic death metal band, Fragments of Unbecoming. Skywards was the first album released under their new label Metal Blade Records on February 10, 2004. The album artwork is dedicated to Anna-Lena. The European release is sold with an extra cardboard-box and the booklet and inlay are a five-color-print.

Album quote

Track list 
 "Up From the Blackest of Soil [Ascension Theme]" − 1:25
 "The Seventh Sunray Enlights My Pathway" − 5:07
 "Shapes of the Pursuers" − 5:07
 "Skywards | A Sylphe's Ascension" − 5:37
 "Mesmerized" − 0:43
 "Entangled Whispers in the Depth" − 4:49
 "Scattered to the Four Winds" − 4:09
 "On a Scar's Edge to Infinity" − 3:57
 "Lour Pulse" − 1:44
 "Fear My Hatred" − 3:36
 "Insane Chaosphere" − 4:41
 "Life's Last Embers [Farewell Theme]" − 0:38

Credits

Band

 Stefan Weimar - Death Vocals, Guitar
 Sascha Ehrich - Guitar, Acoustic guitars
 Wolle Schellenberg - Guitar
 Ingo Maier - Drums

Production and other

 Produced, engineered, mixed and mastered in autumn 2003 by Stefan Hanbuch and Fragments of Unbecoming.
 All lyrics and musical arrangements by Fragments of Unbecoming.
 Band photography by Bernd Siebold.
 Cover artwork "Skywards", booklet design and Fragments of Unbecoming logotype by Sascha Ehrich.

Fragments of Unbecoming albums
2004 albums